The Little Mermaid is a licensed action game by Capcom for the NES and Game Boy, based on the 1989 Disney film of the same name.

Gameplay
The game begins underwater, where Ariel can shoot bubbles to trap her foes and throw them. She can also dig through sand to find treasure and pick up sea shells to break open treasure chests. Treasure chests contain power-ups to increase her bubbles' power and range. Ariel can collect icons scattered throughout the levels to restore health, gain extra lives, or increase the range/power of her bubbles. There are six stages that Ariel must traverse to find Ursula. The stages are The Coral Sea, Sunken Ship, Sea of Ice, Undersea Volcano, and finally two battles at Ursula's Castle.

NES and Game Boy differences
When a stage begins, Ariel descends from the top of the screen to the recommended starting point in the NES version, but just starts out in the recommended position in the Game Boy version. The featured SFX are different in both versions. The start of the stage's BGM can be heard only once in the NES version; although the whole BGM can be repeated in the Game Boy version. The stage backgrounds were more restricted in the Game Boy version than in the NES version. When the player loses a heart, the heart turns into a heart frame in the NES version, but disappears in the Game Boy version. The key scales of the Boss BGM are different in both versions. The BGM speed in the NES version is much faster than in the Game Boy version.

Reception

Sales
The game sold 500,000 copies by December 1991. It was a major hit among female audiences, who accounted for the vast majority of the game's player base.

See also
List of Disney video games

References

External links

1991 video games
Video games based on films
Disney games by Capcom
Disney video games
Game Boy games
Nintendo Entertainment System games
Video games featuring female protagonists
The Little Mermaid (franchise) video games
Video games based on adaptations
Video games developed in Japan
Video games scored by Yasuaki Fujita
Single-player video games